Terry deRoy Gruber is an American photographer, author and filmmaker.

Early life
Terry Gruber’s mother, Aaronel deRoy Gruber, was a professional artist. Growing up in Pittsburgh Pa., Gruber attended Vassar College, during its second year of coeducation where he served as an editor-in-chief of The Vassarion, the college’s yearbook. His position on the yearbook became national news when his freedom of speech was censored in 1975 by the College, before becoming reinstated.

Photography career
Terry Gruber is the founder of Gruber Photographers Inc, where he is leader of a team of photographers, and works in fine arts photography. Gruber also works as a banquet photographer and wedding photographer, and has served as the photographer for the weddings of public figures such as Michael Douglas and Catherine Zeta-Jones; and Billy Joel and Katie Lee. The Bridal Council stated that Gruber was “one of the first reportage photographers to bring a fashionable, spirited eye to the … world of wedding photography”. Magazines that have published his photos include Vogue, Town & Country, and Vanity Fair. As a filmmaker, his 1989 work Not Just Any Flower, made under thesis advisor Martin Scorsese while attending Columbia Film School, is in the permanent film collection of the MoMA in New York and won a Student Emmy Award for Best Comedy.

Books
Books of photographs by Gruber include Working Cats (1979), Fat Cats (1981), and Cat High: The Yearbook (1984). Working Cats features cats who live in working environments, that were recruited from local owners for the book. Using his past experience with yearbooks Gruber created Cat High in 1984 as Paw Prints, the yearbook of a cat high school in Paw Paw, a spoof on yearbooks that had senior cats (and one dog) pose as graduates with mortarboards and other outfits. The title was re-released by Chronicle Books in 2015.

References

Living people
Vassar College alumni
21st-century American photographers
20th-century American photographers
Wedding photographers
Art writers
American fiction writers
Year of birth missing (living people)